Knightstown High School is a high school located in Knightstown, Indiana.

About
Knightstown High School offers AP and ACP (Advanced College Project) credits.

Athletics
Knightstown High School competes in the IHSAA in the Tri-Eastern Conference. Its cheerleading squad has won the State Championship in 2000, 2004, 2005, 2012 and 2013.

See also
 List of high schools in Indiana

References

External links
 Official Website

Public high schools in Indiana
Schools in Henry County, Indiana